Til the Medicine Takes is the sixth studio by the Athens, GA-based band Widespread Panic. The album's name refers to a line in the chorus of the fourth track, "Blue Indian". It was released by Capricorn Records on July 27, 1999. It was re-released in 2001 by Zomba Music Group.

The band once again recorded at John Keane's studio in Athens. The guests included the Dirty Dozen Brass Band, the gospel singer Dottie Peoples, and the vocalist Anne Richmond Boston. It was the band's last record as part of the six-album deal with Capricorn.

The album reached a peak position of #68 on the Billboard 200 chart.

Track listing
All songs by Widespread Panic unless otherwise noted.

Personnel
 John Bell – Vocals, Guitar
 John Hermann – Keyboards, Vocals
 Michael Houser – Guitar, Vocals
 Todd Nance – Drums, Vocals
 Domingo S. Ortiz – Percussion
 Dave Schools – Basses, Acid Loop

Guest Musicians

 Anne Richmond Boston - Background Vocals
 Colin Butler - Turntables
 Efrem Towns, Kevin Harris, Roger Lewis, Julius McKee, Gregory Davis, Corey Henry - Horns
 Josh Hauser - Trombone
 Dave Henry. Ned Henry - Strings
 John Keane - Pedal Steel Guitar, Banjo, Keyboards
 Dottie Peoples - Vocals

Production
 John Keane – producer, engineer, mixing
 Matt Coby – assistant engineer
 David Farrell – engineer
 Rob Haddock – assistant engineer
 Flournoy Holmes – artwork, art direction, design, photography
 Ted Jensen – mastering
 Bradshaw Leigh – engineer
 Joel Morris – sheet music
 Jim Scott – mixing

References

External links
 Widespread Panic website
 Everyday Companion

1999 albums
Capricorn Records albums
Widespread Panic albums
Zomba Group of Companies albums
Albums produced by John Keane (record producer)